Linopherus is a genus of polychaetes belonging to the family Amphinomidae.

The genus has cosmopolitan distribution.

Species:

Linopherus abyssalis 
Linopherus acarunculatus 
Linopherus ambigua 
Linopherus annulata 
Linopherus beibuwanensis 
Linopherus brevis 
Linopherus canariensis 
Linopherus fauchaldi 
Linopherus hemuli 
Linopherus hirsuta 
Linopherus incarunculata 
Linopherus kristiani 
Linopherus microcephala 
Linopherus minuta 
Linopherus oculata 
Linopherus oculifera 
Linopherus oligobranchia 
Linopherus paucibracnchiata
Linopherus paucibranchiata 
Linopherus reducta 
Linopherus spiralis 
Linopherus tripunctata

References

Annelids